Mean Time is the second studio album by English rock band The Barracudas, released in 1983 by record label Closer. The incorporation of Chris Wilson from The Flamin' Groovies gave this new formation a paramount weight in the eighties' garage rock bands' scene.

Track listing
All tracks composed by Jeremy Gluck and Robin Wills; except where noted.
"Grammar of Misery"
"Bad News" (Robin Wills)
"I Ain't No Miracle Worker" (Nancy Mantz, Annette Tucker)
"Be My Friend Again" (Jeremy Gluck, Chris Wilson)
"Shades of Today"
"Dead Skin"
"Middle Class Blues" (Bob Ronco, Chris Wilson)
"You've Come a Long Way" (Robin Wills)
"Ballad of a Liar"
"When I'm Gone" (Robin Wills)
"Eleventh Hour"
"Hear Me Calling" (Robin Wills)

Personnel
The Barracudas
Jeremy Gluck - vocals
Chris Wilson, Robin Wills - guitar, vocals
Jim Dickson - bass, vocals
Terry Smith - drums, percussion
Peter Gage - keyboards
Technical
Mike O'Donnell - engineer

Content 

Trouser Press described the album's sound as a "'60sish blend of punky pop, vintage rock'n'roll, mock Merseybeat, snarly mild psychedelia and Byrdsy 12-string folk-rock."

Reception 

AllMusic called it "the Barracudas' masterpiece", whilst Trouser Press classed it as "wonderful".

References

External links 
 

1983 albums
The Barracudas albums